Léon-Mba International Airport  is an airport 
situated in Libreville, Gabon. It is the main international airport in the country and was constructed in the 1950s.

Airlines and destinations

Passenger

Cargo

Accidents and incidents
Just after takeoff from the airport on June 8th, 2004, Gabon Express Flight 221 dove into the Gulf of Guinea after suffering a hydraulic failure after departure, leading to the deaths of 19 out of the 30 onboard.
 On 6 June 2011, Antonov An-26 TR-LII of Solenta Aviation, operating Flight 122A for DHL Aviation ditched in the sea near Libreville International Airport. Four people on board were rescued and transported to a local hospital, but were not seriously injured. The crew reported hydraulic problems and eyewitnesses stated that the aircraft's propellers were not turning at the time of the ditching.

See also
 List of airports in Gabon
 Transport in Gabon

References

External links
Libreville International Airport official website

Airports in Gabon
Buildings and structures in Libreville
Military installations of France in other countries